Piratininga is a genus of longhorn beetles of the subfamily Lamiinae, containing the following species:

 Piratininga mocoia Galileo & Martins, 2007
 Piratininga piranga Galileo & Martins, 1992

References

Hemilophini
Cerambycidae genera